George Nicolae Simion (born 21 September 1986 in Focșani, Romania) is a Romanian right-wing politician and civic activist. He is the president of the Alliance for the Union of Romanians (AUR), a political party in Romania that gained popularity after its unexpected high result in the 2020 Romanian legislative election.

Simion studied at the Gheorghe Lazăr National College, the University of Bucharest, and the Alexandru Ioan Cuza University, getting in the latter a master's degree in history. After this, he began to be a civic activist in favor of the unification of Moldova and Romania. Simion has created notable organizations and events, such as Action 2012, the Alliance for the Centenary and the Centenary March, and has participated in several protests and demonstrations supporting Moldovans and their rights. These acts have led to prohibitions to him from entering Moldova on several times, one of which is still in effect today.

In 2019, Simion began to participate in politics by running as an independent candidate for the 2019 European Parliament election in Romania, obtaining 117,141 votes. After this, the party Alliance for the Union of Romanians, whose goal is the unification of the Romanian ethnicity and of which Simion is president, was founded on 19 September 2019. However, it has been accused of having a far-right ideology. The AUR became notable after its unexpectedly high score in the 2020 Romanian legislative election.

Personal life
George Simion was born on 21 September 1986 in Focșani, Romania. He graduated from the Gheorghe Lazăr National College of Bucharest. After this, Simion studied in the University of Bucharest, at the Faculty of Business and Administration, and later studied at the Alexandru Ioan Cuza University in Iași, where he obtained a master's degree in history after having as research topic "the crimes of communism". Currently, Simion lives modestly in a small studio apartment in Bucharest and is married with Ilinca Munteanu since 27 August 2022. He allegedly donates 90% of his salary to civic causes, related to Romania or Romanians, month by month.

He has written two books. The first of them is Blocați în labirint ("Locked in [the] maze"), in which he talks about the timeline of the Republic of Moldova from its independence until 2017 (the year in which the book was published). In 2019, he published his second book,  ("How I met them"), in which he talks about how he met important Romanian politicians such as Klaus Iohannis, Dan Barna, Traian Băsescu, and Ion Iliescu, and presents an analysis on the political, economic and social situation of Romania in the last 30 years.

Activism 
In 2004, Simion exhibited the message  ("Heroes never die") in Timișoara on the 15th anniversary of the Romanian Revolution. Two years later, he organized a protest in Bucharest in favor of Moldovan students of the Gheorghe Asachi Romanian-French Theoric Lyceum of Chișinău.

In 2011, he established Action 2012 ( in Romanian), a coalition of NGOs and civic associations advocating for the unification of Moldova and Romania. Action 2012 participated in the 2015–2016 protests in Moldova.

In 2012, he organized the protest in Bălți, Moldova,  ("Bălți feels Romanian"). In 2014, Simion organized a protest in favor of the Romanian Bessarabians after they were insulted by a Romanian television producer.

In 2017, Simion criticized that the Romanian state was not preparing enough events to celebrate the 100th anniversary of the Great Union as other countries like Poland had done. Therefore, he founded the Alliance for the Centenary and announced that many events had been prepared for 2018, including a march from Alba Iulia (Romania) to Chișinău (Moldova).

This march materialized in 2018 as the Centenary March. It was designed in a way that important places for World War I and Great Union of Romania would be visited. The march started on 1 July in Alba Iulia in front of the Coronation Cathedral, where Ferdinand I was proclaimed King of Greater Romania. The march ended as planned on 1 September on Chișinău, where participants were welcomed by thousands of enthusiasts and where they made one final demonstration at the Great National Assembly Square of the city. However, Simion was unable to participate in the final stage of the march in Moldova as he was banned from entering the country earlier on 28 August.

Entry bans into Moldova 
Simion's unionist activities and events have provoked discontent from the Moldovan authorities, which have expelled him on several occasions. The first time that this happened was in March 2009, while a protest commemorating the 91st anniversary of the union of Bessarabia with Romania was taking place. Simion, along with Eugen Rusu, one of the main organizers of the event, were arrested for "violating public order". Rusu was placed under administrative detention and Simion was fined and released. This was followed by the prohibition of dozens of Romanian citizens of entering Moldova. For all of this, the Ministry of Foreign Affairs of Romania asked for explanations. The second time Simion was banned from entering Moldova was on 16 December 2014. This was supposed to be lifted on 20 December, but he was allowed to enter Moldova a few hours later through Sculeni.

On 14 May 2015, Simion was banned for the third time from entering Moldova for a period of 5 years for "endangering national security" through his events, becoming a persona non grata. As a result, the Romanian embassy in Chișinău demanded explanations. This decision was lifted on 18 September. However, once again, on 5 February 2016, he was banned for the fourth time, but this was annulated the next day.

On 28 August 2018, Simion, while participating in the Centenary March, was again banned for the fifth time for a period of 30 days for "displaying aggressive and inappropriate behavior and refusing to comply with legal procedures to cross the state border [between Moldova and Romania]". The sixth and last time in which Simion was banned from entering into Moldova was in 1 October for a period of five years. He was allegedly arrested and beaten up, uploading to Facebook a picture with a head injury and another one with the prohibition document stained with blood. The Moldovan police rejected these declarations and said that the procedure was carried out in a peaceful manner. This ban is still in force today.

Political career

2019 European Parliament election in Romania
In 2019, Simion entered the world of politics by announcing his intention to participate as an independent candidate in the European Parliament election in Romania of 26 May 2019. Having already been campaigner for the unification of Moldova and Romania, Simion had as his main objective making this project a European one.

In addition to this, he promoted an "anti-party" message, arguing that only an independent candidate and not the different partisan interests could truly represent the interests of the Romanians. Simion declared he would fight for the rights of the Romanian minorities, such as in Serbia or Ukraine, and also the protection of the rights of Romanian diaspora members working in the European Union (EU). He also expressed his intention to stop the country's illegal deforestation and the construction of highways connecting Moldova and Romania.

Simion also promised to bring at least one child from every Romanian locality to the city of Brussels to explain to them how do European institutions work and to donate three-quarters of his salary as a Member of the European Parliament (MEP) to projects in Romania or Moldova. Apart from Simion, there were two other independent candidates in the election, Gregoriana Tudoran and Peter Costea.

Simion got 117,141 (1.29%) of the votes in the election, failing to get a seat on the European Parliament (EP).

Alliance for the Union of Romanians
On 19 September 2019, the Romanian political party Alliance for the Union of Romanians (AUR) was formally established. Initially, Simion was one of the two co-presidents of the party, the other being Claudiu Târziu. Time later, on 1 December, during the Great Union Day (the national day of Romania), Simion said the AUR intended to run in the 2020 Romanian local and legislative elections of the country. This person was the candidate of the AUR in the 2020 local elections of Romania in the city of Bucharest. He got 0.67% of the votes, getting the 7th place. At national level, the AUR only won in three towns: Amara, Pufești and Valea Lungă.

AUR's popularity increased after obtaining 9% of the votes at the 2020 Romanian legislative election, becoming Romania's fourth-largest party despite having been created just over a year ago at the time. This popularity increase also affected the Internet. The party had a high support from the diaspora, coming first among Romanians in Italy and Cyprus and second among Romanians in France and Spain.

According to the party's website, the AUR's ultimate goal is to achieve the unification of all Romanians "wherever they are located, in Bucharest, Iași, Timișoara, Cernăuți, Timoc, Italy or Spain". It has four self-described pillars: family, nation, Christian faith, and liberty. The AUR supports the unification of Moldova and Romania and has been accused with being ultranationalist, far-right, opposed to same-sex marriage, anti-mask, anti-vaccine and Magyarophobic.

They talked about the situation of strategic state-owned companies and a bill against Internet censorship. Simion gave Fogiel a map of Greater Romania. On 21 January, the co-president of AUR met in Brussels with conservative MEPs, where they talked about the European mobility package, the European Green Deal, the implementation of a "vaccine passport" and Big Tech censorship. Following the meetings, on 22 January, Simion announced that the AUR would affiliate itself with the "European political family of conservatives and reformists".

On 27 March 2022, the first congress of the AUR was held at the Palace of the Parliament. Simion ran to be voted in as party president, his only opponent being the then AUR deputy in the Constanța County Dănuț Aelena. Aelena stated that he only nominated himself to show that AUR was a democratic party and that he did not want to "expel" Simion from the party, admitting that he was less well-known than him. Simion got 784 votes while Aelena received 38, meaning that Simion became the party's sole president after having previously shared this post with Târziu, who became the president of the party's CNC.

Controversies
On the clashes also participated members of the Noua Dreaptă.

Furthermore, Simion, together with Târziu, supported Călin Georgescu as prime minister of the country during the 2020 legislative election. Georgescu is a controversial person due to the support he has received by the Federation "Romanian Civil Society", an organization that congratulated Russia for its illegal annexation of Crimea, and by Sputnik, a news agency of the Russian Government. Simion and his party have also been criticized for helping two former soldiers (Francisc Tobă and Nicolae Roman) who are alleged to have participated in the repression of the Romanian Revolution in 1989 to incorporate into the Romanian Parliament. The party members' presence in front of the Romanian National Opera of Timișoara, a symbol of the Romanian Revolution, also provoked discontent. Simion was asked to remove both persons to prove his good faith when participating in protests commemorating the revolution.

Electoral history

2019 European Parliament election (Romania)
The results were the following:

References

External links

  
  

1986 births
Living people
People from Focșani
Alliance for the Union of Romanians politicians
Leaders of political parties in Romania
Members of the Chamber of Deputies (Romania)
Members of the Romanian Orthodox Church
University of Bucharest alumni
Alexandru Ioan Cuza University alumni
Gheorghe Lazăr National College (Bucharest) alumni